Literacy rate in India is uneven and as such, different states and union territories of India have differences in their literacy rates. The following table shows the details from 1951 to 2011 census data on total literacy rate in percentage. According to Census 2011, Kerala has the highest total literacy rate and female literacy rate whereas Lakshadweep had the highest male literacy rate. Andhra Pradesh has the lowest overall literacy rate. Rajasthan has the lowest male literacy rate, while Bihar has the lowest female literacy rate. Literacy rates  are collected by census takers, which essentially means literacy (or lack therefore) is self assessed.

Recent estimates

Timeline by Census

Literacy by Social Group

Literacy rate for different castes

Literacy rate by different religions

See also 
 Literacy in India
 Education in India
 Gender inequality in India

References

Notes
  Administered as a Union territory directly by Central government.

Sources

Further reading 
 
 

Literacy rate
States and union territories by literacy rate
States and union territories by literacy rate
India,literacy